The tenure of Anwar Ibrahim as the prime minister of Malaysia began on 24 November 2022 when he was appointed to the office by Yang di-Pertuan Agong Al-Sultan Abdullah Ri'ayatuddin Al-Mustafa Billah Shah after 2022 Malaysian general election.

Forming the federal government

In the 2022 Malaysian general election on 19 November 2022, Anwar's Pakatan Harapan coalition won a plurality of 82 seats out of 222, below the 112 seats needed for a majority. On 20 November, Anwar said that Pakatan Harapan had negotiated with other parties to form the federal government with a majority pending approval by the Yang di-Pertuan Agong, but Anwar refused to mention which other parties were cooperating with Pakatan Harapan. Also that day, Perikatan Nasional leader Muhyiddin Yassin claimed to have a sufficient majority to be appointed as Prime Minister, citing support from Perikatan Nasional, Barisan Nasional, Gabungan Parti Sarawak, and Gabungan Rakyat Sabah. On 21 November, Anwar was one of several Pakatan Harapan leaders that met in Seri Pacific Hotel with several Barisan Nasional leaders, including Ahmad Zahid Hamidi and Ismail Sabri Yaakob.

On 22 November, the royal palace stated that after the Yang di-Pertuan Agong reviewed the statutory declarations for prime minister, he found that "no member of parliament has the majority support to be appointed prime minister", so the Yang di-Pertuan Agong summoned Anwar and Muhyiddin to meet him. After the meeting, Muhyiddin said that the Yang di-Pertuan Agong proposed a unity government between Pakatan Harapan and Perikatan Nasional, but Muhyiddin rejected it as Perikatan Nasional "will not cooperate" with Pakatan Harapan; while Anwar acknowledged that the prime minister had yet to be determined, while stating that "given time, I think we will secure a simple majority".

Anwar was sworn-in as Malaysia's 10th Prime Minister on 24 November 2022, by the Yang di-Pertuan Agong, Al-Sultan Abdullah, after consulting with the Conference of Rulers of Malaysia. However, Muhyiddin continued to insist that he had the support of a majority of 115 MPs to form the next government and called on Anwar to prove his majority by showing his Statutory Declarations. As of 24 November, Anwar had received support from MPs from PH, BN, GPS, Warisan, MUDA and PBM, as well as independent MPs. Anwar pledged to hold a vote of confidence on 19 December 2022, once MPs had been sworn into the Dewan Rakyat.

On 25 November, both Anwar and GRS leader Hajiji Noor stated that GRS had joined the unity government, supporting Anwar; this resulted in Anwar having two-thirds support in Parliament, stated Anwar. Meanwhile, Muhyiddin congratulated Anwar and acknowledged him as Prime Minister, thanked Anwar for inviting PN to join the unity government, and declined Anwar's invitation, stating that PN would play the role of a "credible opposition" to ensure "corruption-free governance".

Cabinet appointments

Anwar announced his cabinet on December 2. He took on the role of Minister of Finance concurrently with prime minister, while head of Barisan Nasional Ahmad Zahid Hamidi and Fadillah Yusof were appointed deputy prime ministers. Zahid's appointment was in spite of his ongoing trials for money laundering, bribery and criminal breach of trust.

First 100 days

Sabah political crisis

The 2023 Sabah political crisis began on 6 January 2023, when the state government of Sabah led by Gabungan Rakyat Sabah (GRS) collapsed when its coalition party Barisan Nasional (BN) withdrew its support. The Leader of UMNO Sabah, a component party of BN, Bung Moktar Radin cited a lack of confidence in the leadership of Chief Minister of Sabah Hajiji Noor in the withdrawal. On 9 January, both Malaysian prime minister Anwar Ibrahim and deputy prime minister Ahmad Zahid Hamidi travelled to Kota Kinabalu to meet with Sabah political leaders.

Domestic affairs
On the first parliamentary session of his premiership, Anwar called a vote of confidence in his leadership on 19 December and won it with a simple majority. Anwar also announced cuts in energy subsidies for large businesses.

Foreign affairs

See also
Premiership of Najib Razak
Premiership of Mahathir Mohamad
Premiership of Muhyiddin Yassin
Premiership of Ismail Sabri Yaakob

References

Anwar Ibrahim
Politics of Malaysia